Golden Kiwis – The Hits Collection is a 3-disc New Zealand compilation album released in 2005 featuring hit songs from the 1960s to the 1980s.

Track listing

Disc one: The Sixties
"I Have Loved Me a Man" - Allison Durbin
"Spinning Spinning Spinning" - The Simple Image
"Do the Bluebeat" - Dinah Lee
"Saint Paul" - Shane
"Miss You Baby" - The Chicks
"Thanks to You" - Mr Lee Grant
"Tumblin' Down" - Maria Dallas
"Theme from an Empty Coffee Lounge" - The Four Fours
"My Son John" - The Rebels
"Love, Hate, Revenge" - The Avengers
"Wait for Me Maryanne" - The Dedikation
"She's a Mod" - Ray Columbus & The Invaders
"How Is the Air up There" - La De Das
"Viva Bobbie Jo" - The Revival
"Daylight Saving Time" - Sandy Edmonds
"The White Rabbit" - Peter Posa
"Come with Me" - The Fourmyula
"Fortune Teller" - Ray Woolf
"Rain and Tears" - Hi Revving Tongues
"Sittin' in the Rain" - The Underdogs
"Gloria" - The Pleazers
"Let's Think of Something" - Larry's Rebels
"The Twist" - Herma Keil
"The Coming Generation" - The Gremlins
"Honey Do" - The Challenge
"Yes My Darlin'" - The Pleasers

Disc two: The Seventies
"When Jo Jo Runs" - Craig Scott
"Tequila Sunrise" - Annie Whittle
"Brandy" - Bunny Walters
"Good Morning Mr Rock and Roll" - Headband
"Out In The Street" - Space Waltz
"Dance All Around the World" - Blerta
"Coughtry High" - Ticket
"It Doesn't Matter Anymore" - Mark Williams
"Pretty Girl" - Hogsnort Rupert
"Join Together" - Steve Allen
"Make a Wish Amanda" - The In Betweens
"Miss September" - Bulldogs Allstar Goodtime Band
"Say a Prayer" - Chapta
"Today I Killed a Man I Didn't Know" - Nash Chase
"Only Time Could Let Us Know" - Link
"Carolina" - The Creation
"1905" - Shona Laing
"Lovely Lady" - John Hanlon
"L'Amour Est L'enfant De La Liberte" - The Rumour
"Sunshine Through a Prism" - Suzanne
"Looking Through the Eyes of a Beautiful Girl" - Kal Q Lated Risk
"Come to the Sabbat" - Timberjack
"Sweet Inspiration" - The Yandall Sisters
"Thru the Southern Moonlight" - Rockinghorse

Disc three: The Seventies and Eighties
"Slipping Away" - Max Merritt
"Make Love to You" - Tina Cross
"I Need Your Love" - Golden Harvest
"Words" - Sharon O'Neill
"April Sun In Cuba" - Dragon
"Walkin' in Light" - Th' Dudes
"Blue Lady" - Hello Sailor
"Tears" - The Crocodiles
"People" - Mi-Sex
"Love at First Night" - Kim Hart
"Montego Bay" - Jon Stevens
"Day Trip to Bangor" - Cathy & the Cucumbers
"Life Begins at Forty" - Dave & the Dynamos
"Shoop Shoop Diddy Wop" - Monte Video
"Forever Tuesday Morning" - The Mockers
"Heart and Soul" - The Narcs
"Room That Echoes" - Peking Man
"Sensation" - Fan Club
"Destiny in Motion" - Satellite Spies
"Melting Pot" - When The Cat's Away

Compilation albums by New Zealand artists
2005 greatest hits albums